The 2017–18 Fordham Rams women's basketball team represents Fordham University during the 2017–18 NCAA Division I women's basketball season. The Rams were led by seventh-year head coach Stephanie Gaitley. They were members of the Atlantic 10 Conference and play their home games at the Rose Hill Gymnasium. They finished the season 24–10, 12–4 in A-10 play to finish in third place. They advanced to the quarterfinals of the A-10 women's tournament where they lost to Saint Joseph's. They received an at-large bid to the Women's National Invitation Tournament where they defeated Harvard and Drexel in the first and second rounds before losing to Virginia Tech in the third round.

Media

Forham Rams Sports Network
Forham Rams games will be broadcast on WFUV Sports and streamed online through the Fordham Portal. Most home games will also be featured on the A-10 Digital Network. Select games will be televised.

Roster

Schedule

|-
!colspan=9 style="background:#; color:white;"| Exhibition

|-
!colspan=9 style="background:#; color:white;"| Non-conference regular season

|-
!colspan=9 style="background:#; color:white;"| Atlantic 10 regular season

|-
!colspan=9 style="background:#; color:white;"| Atlantic 10 Women's Tournament

|-
!colspan=9 style="background:#; color:white;"| WNIT

Rankings
2017–18 NCAA Division I women's basketball rankings

See also
 2017–18 Fordham Rams men's basketball team

References

Fordham
Fordham Rams women's basketball seasons
Fordham
Fordham
Fordham